Viktar Sasunouski (born 29 June 1989) is a Greco-Roman wrestler from Belarus. He competed in the 80 kg weight category at the 2014 and 2015 World Championships and won a silver medal in 2015.

In March 2021, he competed at the European Qualification Tournament in Budapest, Hungary hoping to qualify for the 2020 Summer Olympics in Tokyo, Japan.

References

1989 births
Living people
Belarusian male sport wrestlers
European Games bronze medalists for Belarus
European Games medalists in wrestling
Wrestlers at the 2015 European Games
World Wrestling Championships medalists
People from Barysaw
Sportspeople from Minsk Region
20th-century Belarusian people
21st-century Belarusian people